Paranitocris is a genus of longhorn beetles of the subfamily Lamiinae, containing the following species:

 Paranitocris cyanipennis Breuning, 1950
 Paranitocris luci Lepesme & Breuning, 1955

References

Saperdini